Gian Marco Marcucci (born 25 July 1954) served as a Captain Regent of San Marino from 1 April 2000 to 1 October 2000.  He served with Maria Domenica Michelotti. He is of the Sammarinese Christian Democratic Party.

References

Living people
Captains Regent of San Marino
Members of the Grand and General Council
1954 births
Sammarinese Christian Democratic Party politicians